The Eastern Front  (Modern Turkish: Şark Cephesi or Doğu Cephesi) was one of the fronts of the Army of the Grand National Assembly during the Turkish War of Independence. Its commanded all military units in Eastern Region. At first, its headquarters was located at Erzurum, and moved to Sarıkamış, then Kars during the Turkish–Armenian War (which itself is usually referred to synecdochically as the Eastern Front of the Turkish War of Independence).

The Eastern Front has its foundations in remnants of the XV Corps of the Ottoman Army. It engaged in the Turkish–Armenian War and the Georgian operations.

Formations

Order of battle of the XV Corps, April 2, 1919
On April 2, 1919, the XV Corps was organized as follows:

3rd Caucasian Division (commander: Kaymakam Halid Bey (Karsıalan), chief of staff: Kurmay Binbaşı Yusuf Kemal Bey, Tortum - Isısu - Zivin - Girekösek areas, headquarters: Girekösek, present-day Yeşildere)
7th Caucasian Infantry Regiment (Zivin, moved to Trabzon)
8th Caucasian Infantry Regiment (Tortum, moved to Gümüşhane)
11th Caucasian Infantry Regiment (İspir, moved to Hopa)
3rd Artillery Regiment
Cavalry company
Health company
 9th Caucasian Division (commander: Miralay Rushidi Bey, chief of staff: Kurmay Binbaşı Fahri Bey, Erzurum - Hasankale areas, headquarters: Erzurum)
17th Caucasian Infantry Regiment (Erzurum, moved to Erzincan and Mamahatun areas)
28th Caucasian Infantry Regiment (Hasankale, Bayburt, Hat areas)
29th Caucasian Infantry Regiment (Hasankale)
9th Artillery Regiment  (Hasankale)
Cavalry company
Health company
 11th Caucasian Division (commander: Kaymakam Djavid Bey (Erdel), chief of staff: Kurmay Binbaşı Veysel Bey (Ünüvar), Doğubayazıt - Van - Erniş areas, headquarters: Van)
18th Caucasian Infantry Regiment (Doğubayazıt area)
33rd Caucasian Infantry Regiment (Erniş)
34th Caucasian Infantry Regiment (Van)
11th Artillery Regiment (1st Battalion - Van, 2nd Battalion - Erniş)
Cavalry company  (Van)
Health company (Van)
 12th Division (commander: Kaymakam Osman Nuri Bey (Koptagel), chief of staff: Kurmay Yüzbaşı Yusuf Kâmil Bey, Kötek - Tuti - Kamasor present-day Yolaçan, Kars) areas, headquarters: Ali Çeyrek in Horasan)
34th Infantry Regiment (between Horasan and Zirin)
35th Infantry Regiment (Pasin Karakilisesi area)
36th Infantry Regiment (Horasan)
12th Artillery Regiment (one battalion - Tuti, one battalion - Kamasor)
Cavalry company
Health company
15th Infantry Regiment
15th Cavalry Regiment (commander: Miralay Mehmed Bey)
15th Artillery Regiment (commander: Miralay Faruk Bey)
15th Engineer Company
15th Construction Company
15th Transport Company
11th Transport Company
Transport Company
Headquarters Cavalry Company
Flight Squadron
Telegraph Company
Service Company
Wireless Telegraph Company
Military Band Company
Erzurum Fortified Area Command
Heavy Artillery Regiment
Engineer Battalion
Wireless Telegraph Detachment
Searchlight Detachment

Order of Battle of the XV Corps, May 15, 1919
On May 15, 1919, the XV Corps was organized as follows:

Order of Battle, June 22, 1920
On June 22, 1920, the Eastern Front was organized as follows:

Nahcivan Detachment

On August 11, 1920, the Nahcivan Detachment was organized as follows:
1st Battalion of the 18th Infantry Regiment
1st Battalion of the 34th Infantry Regiment
Machinegun Company of the 34th Infantry Regiment
2nd Company of the 34th Infantry Regiment
Machinegun Company
4th Battery
HG of the Nahcivan Detachment

Order of Battle, October 1, 1922
On October 1, 1922, the Eastern Front was organized as follows:

Sources

See also
Turkish–Armenian War
Red Army invasion of Georgia
XV Corps (Ottoman Empire)
Treaty of Alexandropol
Treaty of Kars

Fronts of Turkey
Military units and formations of Turkey in the Turkish War of Independence
History of Erzurum
Military units and formations established in 1920
Military units and formations disestablished in 1923

tr:Türk Kurtuluş Savaşı Doğu Cephesi